Minuscule 571 (in the Gregory-Aland numbering), ε 1294 (in the Soden numbering), is a Greek minuscule manuscript of the New Testament, on parchment. Palaeographically it has been assigned to the year 12th century. It was labeled by Scrivener as 474.
The manuscript is lacunose.

Description 

The codex contains the text of the four Gospels on 194 parchment leaves (size ) with lacunae (John 7:1-21:25). The writing is in one column per page, 22-24 lines per page.

Text 

The Greek text of the codex is a representative of the Byzantine text-type. Hermann von Soden classified it to the textual family Kx. Aland placed it in Category V.
According to the Claremont Profile Method it represents Kx in Luke 10 and Luke 20. In Luke 1 it has mixed Byzantine text.

History 

The manuscript was examined and described by Pogodin and Eduard de Muralt (along with the codices 565-566, 568-570, 572, 574, 575, and 1567), who made first collation of its text. The manuscript was more thoroughly examined by Kurt Treu.

Currently the manuscript is housed at the National Library of Russia (Gr. 98) in Saint Petersburg.

See also 

 List of New Testament minuscules
 Biblical manuscript
 Textual criticism

References

Further reading 

 Eduard de Muralt, Catalogue des manuscrits grecs de la Bibliothèque Impériale publique (Petersburg 1864).
 Eduard de Muralt, Novum Testamentum Graece (Hamburg, 1848)
 Kurt Treu, Die griechischen Handschriften des Neuen Testaments in der UdSSR; eine systematische Auswertung des Texthandschriften in Leningrad, Moskau, Kiev, Odessa, Tbiblisi und Erevan, Texte und Untersuchungen 91 (Berlin, 1966), pp. 60–61.

Greek New Testament minuscules
12th-century biblical manuscripts
National Library of Russia collection